Gim Ikhun(Hangul:김익훈, Hanja:金益勳, 1619 – March 11, 1689) was from the Gwangsan Kim clan (광산김씨, 光山金氏).  He was a politician, a general, and part of the noble class during the Joseon Dynasty.  His pen name was Gwangnam (광남, 光南) and his courtesy name was Mu-suk (무숙, 懋叔).

Life 
Kim Ikhun was born in 1619. He was the son of Kim Ban, the grandson of Kim Jangsaeng and a member of the Gwangsan Kim clan.

Due to Eumseo(음서), he was appointed to Geombudosa (의금부도사, 義禁府都事) and also appointed to the mayor of Namwon (남원부사, 南原府使).  He became Saboksichumjeong (사복시첨정, 司僕寺僉正).  In 1667, he became Sadosijeong (사도시정, 司導寺正)

In 1678, he was the mayor of Gwangju (광주부윤, 廣州府尹), then became a general in the department of Eoyeong (어영대장).  He also became Jeolla Province Byeongmajeoldosa (전라도병마절도사).  In 1680, he was again reappointed as the mayor of Gwangju and then was dismissed.

On March 11, 1689, he was murdered by the Southerners at age 70.

Family 
 Grandfather Gim Jangsaeng
 Uncle Gim Jip
 Father Gim Ban
 Brother Gim Ikgyeom
 Mother Lady Seo

See also 
 Gim Jangsaeng
 Gim Jip
 Sukjong of Joseon
 Gim Seokju
 Gim Chuntaek
 Queen Ingyeong
 Gim Manjung
 Gwangsan Kim clan

Notes

External links 
 Kim Ikhun:Naver 
 Kim Ikhun 
 Kim Ikhun:Korean Historical people's Information 
 Gim Ikhun 
 Gim Ikhun 

1619 births
1689 deaths
Korean military personnel
17th-century Korean writers
Assassinated Korean politicians
People murdered in Korea
Gwangsan Kim clan